The Army–Navy Game is an American college football rivalry game between the Army Black Knights of the United States Military Academy (USMA) at West Point, New York, and the Navy Midshipmen of the United States Naval Academy (USNA) at Annapolis, Maryland. The Black Knights, or Cadets, and Midshipmen each represent their service's oldest officer commissioning sources. As such, the game has come to embody the spirit of the interservice rivalry of the United States Armed Forces. The game marks the end of the college football regular season and the third and final game of the season's Commander-in-Chief's Trophy series, which also includes the Air Force Falcons of the United States Air Force Academy (USAFA) near Colorado Springs, Colorado.

The Army–Navy game is one of the most traditional and enduring rivalries in college football. It has been frequently attended by sitting U.S. presidents. The game has been nationally televised each year since 1945 on either ABC, CBS, or NBC. CBS has televised the game since 1996 and has the rights to the broadcast through 2028.  With the exception of 2022, ESPN's College GameDay has been televised from the game site on a yearly basis since 2014. Instant replay made its American debut in the 1963 Army–Navy game. Since 2009, the game has been held on the second Saturday of December and following FBS conference championship weekend.

The game is primarily played in Philadelphia, but the game has also been held in multiple locations including Chicago in 1926 and Pasadena, California in 1983. After Philadelphia, the New York area and the Baltimore–Washington area have most frequently hosted the game.

Through the 2022 meeting, Navy leads the series 62–54–7.

Series history

Army and Navy first met on the field on November 29, 1890. They have met annually all but five years since then, and in every season since 1930. The game has been held at several locations throughout its history, including New York City and Baltimore, but has most frequently been played in Philadelphia, roughly equidistant from the two academies. Historically played on the Saturday after Thanksgiving (a date on which most other major college football teams end their regular seasons), the game is now played on the second Saturday in December and is traditionally the last regular-season game played in NCAA Division I football.

For much of the first two thirds of the 20th century, both Army and Navy were often national powers, and the game occasionally had national championship implications. However, as the level of play in college football increased, the high academic entrance requirements, and height and weight limits reduced the overall competitiveness of both academies. Since 1963, only the 1996, 2010, 2016 and 2017 games have seen both teams enter with winning records. Nonetheless, the game is considered a college football institution. It has aired nationally on radio since 1930, and has been nationally televised every year since 1945, remaining an over-the-air broadcast even in the age of cable and satellite.

The game is especially emotional for the seniors, called "first classmen" by both academies, since it is typically the last competitive regular season football game they will ever play (though they sometimes play in a subsequent bowl game). However, some participants in the Army–Navy Game have gone on to professional football careers. For example, quarterback Roger Staubach (Navy, 1965) went on to a Hall of Fame career with the Dallas Cowboys that included starting at quarterback in two Super Bowl victories including being named the Most Valuable Player of Super Bowl VI and Alejandro Villanueva (Army, 2010) was later an offensive tackle with the Pittsburgh Steelers and the Baltimore Ravens.

The game is the last of three contests in the annual Commander-in-Chief's Trophy series, awarded to each season's winner of the triangular series among Army, Navy, and Air Force since 1972. The rivalries Army and Navy have with Air Force are much less intense than the Army–Navy rivalry, primarily due to the relative youth of the USAFA, established in 1954, and the physical distance between the USAFA and the other two schools. The Army–Air Force and Navy–Air Force games are usually played at the academies' regular home fields, although on occasion they have been held at a neutral field.

Since 1901, there have been ten sitting presidents of the United States to attend the Army–Navy Game. The first was Theodore Roosevelt, who attended the game in 1901 and 1905. Harry S. Truman attended all but one edition during his eight years in office (1945–1952), missing the 1951 game due to vacation. George W. Bush and Donald Trump each attended three times; Bush in 2001, 2004, and 2008, and Trump in 2018, 2019, and 2020. Trump also attended a game as president-elect in 2016. John F. Kennedy attended both games played during his presidency in 1961 and 1962 (President Kennedy was assassinated fifteen days before the 1963 game). Presidents who each attended once include Woodrow Wilson (1913), Calvin Coolidge (1924), Gerald Ford (1974), Bill Clinton (1996), and Barack Obama (2011).

Traditions
The rivalry between Annapolis and West Point, while friendly, is intense. The phrases "Beat Navy!" and "Beat Army!" are ingrained in the respective institutions and have become a symbol of competitiveness, not just in the Army–Navy Game, but in the service of the country. The phrases are often used at the close of (informal) letters by graduates of both academies. A long-standing tradition at the ArmyNavy football game is to conduct a formal "prisoner exchange" as part of the pre-game activities. The prisoners are the cadets and midshipmen currently spending the semester studying at the sister academy. After the exchange, students have a brief reprieve to enjoy the game with their comrades.

The American national anthem is sung by members of the United States Military Academy and the United States Naval Academy choirs. At the end of the game, both teams' almae matres are performed. The winning team stands alongside the losing team and faces the losing academy's students; then the losing team accompanies the winning team, facing their students. This is done in a show of mutual respect and solidarity. Since the winning team's alma mater is always played last, the phrase "sing second" has become synonymous with winning the rivalry game.

Notable games

Navy Midshipman (and later Admiral) Joseph Mason Reeves wore what is widely regarded as the first football helmet in the 1893 Army–Navy Game. He had been advised by a Navy doctor that another kick to his head would result in intellectual disability or even death, so he commissioned an Annapolis shoemaker to make him a helmet out of leather.

On November 27, 1926, the Army–Navy Game was held in Chicago for the National Dedication of Soldier Field as a monument to American servicemen who had fought in World War I. Navy came to the game undefeated, while West Point had only lost to Notre Dame, so the game would decide the National Championship. Played before a crowd of over 100,000, the teams fought to a 21–21 tie, but Navy was awarded the national championship.

In both the 1944 and 1945 contests, Army and Navy entered the game ranked #1 and #2 respectively. The 1945 game was labeled the "game of the century" before it was played. Army defeated a 7–0–1 Navy team 32–13. Navy's tie was against Notre Dame.

In 1963, shortly after the assassination of President John F. Kennedy, Jacqueline Kennedy urged the academies to play after there had been talk of cancellation. Originally scheduled for November 30, 1963, the game was played on December 7, 1963, also coinciding with the 22nd anniversary of Pearl Harbor Day. In front of a crowd of 102,000 people in Philadelphia's Municipal Stadium, later renamed John F. Kennedy Stadium, junior (second class midshipman) quarterback Roger Staubach led number two ranked Navy to victory which clinched a Cotton Bowl national championship matchup with Texas. Army was led by junior (second class cadet) quarterback Rollie Stichweh. Stichweh led off the game with a touchdown drive that featured the first use of instant replay on television. Army nearly won the game after another touchdown and two point conversion, Stichweh recovered the onside kick and drove the ball to the Navy 2 yard line. On 4th down and no timeouts, crowd noise prevented Stichweh from calling a play and time expired with the 21–15 final score. Staubach won the Heisman Trophy that year and was bumped off the scheduled cover of Life magazine due to the coverage of the assassination. Stichweh and Staubach would meet again in 1964 as seniors where Stichweh's Army would defeat Staubach's Navy. In that game, Calvin Huey of Navy became the first African-American to play in the series. Staubach went on to serve in the Navy and afterward became a Pro Football Hall of Fame quarterback with the Dallas Cowboys. Stichweh served five years in Vietnam with the 173rd Airborne Brigade. Stichweh was inducted into the Army Sports Hall of Fame in 2012.

On December 10, 2016, Army defeated Navy for the first time since 2001 with a 21–17 victory, snapping its 14-game losing streak against Navy.

In 2022, Army defeated Navy by a score of 20-17 in double overtime in the first overtime game in the series' history.

Venues
Only seven games have ever been held on the campus of either academy, primarily because neither team plays at an on-campus stadium large enough to accommodate the large crowds that attend. Army's Michie Stadium seats only 38,000, and Navy's Navy–Marine Corps Memorial Stadium 34,000. For all but a few years since 1899, the game has been played at a neutral site.

Philadelphia has been the traditional home of the Army–Navy game. Through the 2022 meeting, 90 of the 123 games in the series have been contested in Philadelphia, including every game from 1932 to 1982 except three games that were relocated due to World War II travel restrictions. Philadelphia is typically selected as the site due to the historic nature of the city and its location approximately halfway between West Point and Annapolis. For decades, the Pennsylvania Railroad and its successors offered game-day service to all Army–Navy games in Philadelphia using a sprawling temporary station constructed each year near Municipal Stadium on the railroad's Greenwich freight yard. The service, with more than 40 trains serving as many as 30,000 attendees, was the single largest concentrated passenger rail movement in the country.

All games contested in Philadelphia through 1935 were played at what is now Franklin Field, the home field of the University of Pennsylvania. From 1936 through 1979, all games contested in Philadelphia were held at Municipal Stadium, renamed John F. Kennedy Stadium in 1964. From 1980 to 2001, all games contested in Philadelphia took place at Veterans Stadium. Since 2003, all games contested in Philadelphia have been played at Lincoln Financial Field.

The rivalry's first four games were hosted on the parade grounds of the respective academies, two games were held on campus due to World War II travel restrictions (1942 at Navy's old Thompson Stadium, 1943 at Michie Stadium), and the 2020 game was held at Michie Stadium due to COVID-19 restrictions in Philadelphia.

Outside of Philadelphia, the New York area has been the most frequent Army–Navy site. The Polo Grounds holds the record for most games hosted outside of Philadelphia with nine.  It was the location of all New York City games through 1927. Yankee Stadium was the site of the game in 1930 and 1931. Six games have been hosted in New Jersey: 1905 at Osborne Field at Princeton University, four games at Giants Stadium from 1989 to 2002, and 2021 at MetLife Stadium.

A number of games throughout the history of the series have also been hosted in Maryland. In Baltimore, Municipal Stadium was the location of the 1924 and 1944 games, with four games being held at M&T Bank Stadium since 2000. In Landover, FedExField was the site of the 2011 game.

The Rose Bowl is the only site west of the Mississippi River where an Army–Navy game has been played, in 1983. The city of Pasadena, California, home to the Rose Bowl, paid for the travel expenses of all the students and supporters of both academies – 9,437 in all. The game was held at the Rose Bowl that year because there are a large number of military installations and servicemen and women, along with many retired military personnel, on the West Coast. The game has been held one other time in a non-East Coast venue, at Chicago's Soldier Field, which hosted the 1926 game.

Future venues
 2023 - Gillette Stadium in Foxborough, Massachusetts
 2024 - FedExField in Landover, Maryland
 2025 - M&T Bank Stadium in Baltimore
 2026 - MetLife Stadium in East Rutherford, New Jersey
 2027 - Lincoln Financial Field in Philadelphia

Total games by venue and geography

Stadiums

Cities

Metropolitan areas

States

Game results
Rankings are from the AP Poll.

Note: there were no games for the following years; 1894–1898, 1909, 1917–1918 & 1928–1929

See also 
 Army Mules
 Army–Navy Cup, a college soccer game between the same schools
 Army–Navy lacrosse rivalry
 Bill the Goat
 List of NCAA college football rivalry games
 List of most-played college football series in NCAA Division I
 Secretaries Cup, an annual rivalry game between the Coast Guard Bears and Merchant Marine Mariners

Other neutral-site rivalries
 Florida–Georgia football rivalry
 Red River Showdown, Texas/Oklahoma
 Southwest Classic, Arkansas/Texas A&M

References

Citations

Bibliography
 Feinstein, John (1996). A Civil War: Army Vs. Navy – A Year Inside College Football's Purest Rivalry. Diane Books Publishing.

External links

 

 
Annual sporting events in the United States
Military competitions in American football
Recurring sporting events established in 1890
1890 establishments in New York (state)
College football rivalries in the United States